Lola is a female given name in Spanish, Romance languages, and other language groups. 

It is a short form of the Spanish name Dolores, meaning "sorrows", taken from one of the titles of the Virgin Mary: Nuestra Señora de los Dolores, or Our Lady of Sorrows. 

Lola is also a short form of the unrelated German name Aloisia and a hypocorism of Lolita, in particular in Russian. 

The name Lola is also common in Africa; in Nigeria, many feminine names are shortened to Lola, such as Temilola, Omolola or Damilola.

Lola (Tajik for tulip) is also a feminine name in Uzbekistan, Tajikistan, and Afghanistan. It is derived from the Persian لاله or lâleh.

Lola is also used as a short form of the name Karolina, which was especially popular in use in the 1920s in Poland and is still used. It is also a form of Carol and Charlotte.

Though the name originated with a title for the Blessed Virgin Mary, mother of Jesus Christ, Lola has also acquired a number of contrasting sensual associations. American authors Pamela Redmond Satran and Linda Rosenkrantz noted in their 2008 book Cool Names for Babies that the name has a sultry image and that people associate the name with the song "Whatever Lola Wants, Lola Gets" from the musical Damn Yankees, in which the character of Lola is the Devil's "best homewrecker". The name also has associations with the Irish-born Lola Montez, who became famous in the nineteenth century as an actress, Spanish dancer, courtesan and mistress of King Ludwig I of Bavaria.

Lolita is a Spanish diminutive form of Lola. The name is sometimes used as a term to indicate a sexually precocious girl, due to its association with the title character of Vladimir Nabokov's 1955 novel Lolita and its film adaptations in 1962 and 1997.  The name's sexually charged image in certain countries is also due to associations with "Lola", a 1970 song by The Kinks about a young man's encounter with a transvestite named Lola.

The title character in the 1998 German feature film Run Lola Run may also have raised the name's profile, as has Lola, a clever and inquisitive child character in a recently published series of children's picture books by Lauren Child.

Names beginning with or containing the letter L have also been particularly fashionable for girls.

People named Lola

Lola Albright (1924 – 2017), American singer and actress
Lola Almudevar (1978 – 2007), British journalist and news reporter
Lola Álvarez Bravo (1903 – 1993), Mexican photographer
Dolors Lola Anglada (1893 – 1984), Spanish writer and illustrator
Lola Astanova (born 1982), Russian-born classical pianist
Lola Beeth (1861 – 1940), Austrian soprano opera singer
María Lucila Lola Beltrán (1932 – 1996), Mexican ranchera singer
Lola Berthet (born 1977), Argentine actress
Lola Bobesco (1921 – 2003), Belgian violinist
Lola Braccini, born Camilla Cariddi (1889 - 1969), Italian actress
Lolah Burford (1931 – 2002), American author
Carola Lola Costa, (1903 – 2004), English painter, writer and poet
Lola Cotton (1892 – 1975), American vaudeville hypnotist and mentalist of the early 20th century
María Dolores Lola Dueñas (born 1971), Spanish actress
Lola Beer Ebner, born Carola Zwillinger (1910 – 1997), Israeli fashion designer
Loletha Elayne Lola Falana (born 1942), American dancer and actress
María Dolores Lola Flores (1923 – 1995), Spanish singer, dancer, and actress
Lola Forner (born 1960), also known as María Dolores Forner Toro, Spanish actress
Dolores Lola Gaos (1921 – 1993), Spanish actress
Lola Glaudini (born 1971), American actress
Lola Graham (1918 – 1992), Australian musician
María Dolores Lola Herrera (born 1935), Spanish actress
Lola Lane, born Dorothy Mullican, (1906 – 1981) American actress
Lola J. May (1923 – 2007), American mathematics educator, author and consultant
Lola Lemire Tostevin (born 1937), Canadian poet and novelist
LoLa Monroe born Fershgenet Melaku (born 1986), Ethiopian-born hip hop model
Lola Martinez (broadcaster), news broadcaster
Lola Monaghan, Australian burlesque dancer under the stage name Lola the Vamp
Dolores Candelaria Lola Mora (1866 – 1936), Argentine sculptor
Lola Muñoz, Spanish singer
Zorana Lola Novaković (1935 – 2016), Serbian writer
Lola Pagnani (born 1972), Italian actress
Lola Petticrew (born 1995), actress from Northern Ireland
Rose Emily Lola Ridge (1873 – 1941), Irish-born anarchist poet and Marxist editor
Lola Rodríguez de Tió (1843 – 1924), Puerto Rican poet
Lola Solar (1904–1989), Austrian teacher and politician
Lola Todd (1904 – 1995), American actress
Lola Van Wagenen (born 1938), American historian consumer advocate
Margaret Omolola Lola Young, Baroness Young of Hornsey (born 1951), British artist, writer, and peer

Fictional characters

Films
Lola, in the 1958 film, Damn Yankees!
Lola, a character in Shark Tale
Lola, the title character of Run Lola Run, a 1998 German film
Lola Lola, a dancer played by Marlene Dietrich in the 1930 German tragicomedic film The Blue Angel
Lola, the name of the titular character of Rainer Werner Fassbinder's 1981 film Lola
Lola Lovell, the name of Kylie Minogue's character in the 1989 film The Delinquents

Television
Lola Bunny, a character from the Looney Tunes franchise 
Lola, in later Plaza Sésamo television series
Lola, character in animated series CatDog
Lola, character in sitcom series in South Park
Lola, the name of Agent Phil Coulson's car in Agents of S.H.I.E.L.D.
Lola, character in the novel Atonement
Lola, character in American television series Reign
Lola Luftnagle, alter ego of the character Lilly Truscott on the Disney TV series Hannah Montana
Lola Mbola, main character and African-American girl in Robotboy
Lola, a character on the Spanish television series Lola & Virginia
Lola, a sketch comedy character played by Catherine O'Hara on SCTV
Lola, main character in telenovela Lola...Erase una vez
Lola Boa, character in American animated television series Brandy and Mr. Whiskers
Lola Rhodes, Charlotte Rhodes character on Gossip Girl (season 5 & 6)
Lola Spratt, in American black comedy television series and web series Childrens Hospital
Lola Sonner, one of the protagonists in Charlie and Lola
Lola Loud, a character from the American animated television series The Loud House
Lola Martinez, character in American comedy-drama television series Zoey 101

Literature
Lola Lola, the infamous seductress of Heinrich Mann's novel Professor Unrat
Lola Sonner, one of the main characters from children's book Charlie and Lola
Lola Limekiller, a minor character in the comic strip Bloom County
Lola Cep, character in the novel Confessions of a Teenage Drama Queen
Lola, a character in Graham Greene's 1937 short story "The Innocent"
Lola, a supporting character in Coco Ouwerkerk's webcomic Acception
Lola Osborne, in the 1900 novel Sister Carrie

Music
Lola, the subject of The Kinks' 1970 single "Lola"
Lola, the main character in the Barry Manilow song, "Copacabana".
Lola, the mascot of Gerard Way, derived from the album "Hesitant Alien."

Musicals
Lola, in the Broadway musical comedy Damn Yankees
Lola, in the Broadway musical Kinky Boots

Others
Lola "La Trailera" (Lola "The Truck Driver"), a fictional character for Mexican actress Rosa Gloria Chagoyán that made her a Mexican action and low-budget films actress in the 1970s
"Lola" is a nickname given to the female portrayal of "Shepard", the central protagonist of the video game series Mass Effect. She receives this nick name in Mass Effect 3 from her crew mate, Lieutenant James Vega.
Lola Rembrite, a dateable character in the dating simulation videogame Huniepop
Lola Pop, a candy-themed clown with the power of body inflation from Nintendo's Arms

Video game
Lola, a character in MOBA video game Brawl Stars

See also

Lota (name)
Rola (name)

Notes

Spanish feminine given names
Feminine given names